Trenton Speedway was a racing facility located near Trenton, New Jersey at the New Jersey State Fairgrounds.  Races for the United States' premier open-wheel and full-bodied racing series of the times were held at Trenton Speedway.

Racing history
The first race at the Fairgrounds was held on September 24, 1900, but there was no further racing there until 1907. Regular racing began in 1912 and continued until 1941. A new 1 mile dirt oval was opened in 1946. In 1957 the track was paved. It operated in that configuration until 1968 when the track was expanded to 1.5 miles (2.41 km) and a "kidney bean" shape with a 20° right-hand dogleg on the back stretch and a wider turn 3 & 4 complex than turns 1 & 2. The track closed in 1980 and the Fairgrounds itself closed 3 years later. The former site of the speedway is now occupied by the Grounds for Sculpture, a UPS shipping facility, and the housing development known as "Hamilton Lakes".

Champ Car at Trenton Speedway
Trenton was a long-time stop for the AAA and USAC Championship Car series. Its first recognized Champ Car race was held in 1949 on the dirt mile. The series did not return until 1957 when the track was paved, but when it did, at least one Champ Car race was held every year until 1979. The final Champ Car races held in 1979 at the track were sanctioned by CART. During his career A. J. Foyt won twelve Indy Car races at Trenton Speedway. The May 1976 race was Janet Guthrie's first IndyCar appearance.

NASCAR at Trenton Speedway
Trenton hosted the NASCAR Grand National and Winston Cup series 8 times: once each May in 1958 and 1959, and once each July from 1967 to 1972, a race known as the Northern 300. Richard Petty led all drivers with three Trenton Grand National victories. In July 1973 the Northern 300 ran time trials but rain washed out the race and it was never rescheduled. The Northern 300 was placed on NASCAR's 1974 Winston Cup Grand National schedule (Stock Car Racing magazine listed it on the schedule in its early 1974 season issues) but was dropped early in the year and replaced by Pocono Raceway's Purolator 500.

Major races for NASCAR Modifieds

Race of Champions
From 1972 to 1976, Trenton Speedway hosted the Race of Champions modified race. Five different drivers won the five RoC events at Trenton. In 1977, the Race of Champions was moved to Pocono Raceway.

Other National Championship races for NASCAR Modifieds
From 1958 to 1971, a NASCAR National Championship race for Sportsman-Modified Stock Cars was held annually at Trenton Speedway, promoted by Sam Nunis.  Through 1962, these were hundred-lap races.  In 1963, the race was expanded to 200 laps, making it one of the longest and highest-paying races for Modified and Sportsman racers in the country.  Ray Hendrick from Virginia was the leading winner of these races, driving the Jack Tant-owned number 11.

State Fair "Triple Headers"
During the mid-1960s, at the time of the State Fair in September, the speedway hosted a special "Triple Header" event. A 50 lap modified-sportsman race and two 25 lap races, one for URC Sprint Cars and one for ARDC Midgets was staged. These were some of the most exciting races for local drivers to compete on the 1 mile asphalt track. The likes of the colorful drivers of the era were named "Jiggs" Peters, "Gig" Stephens, "Wiggles" Johnson and "Pee Wee" Griffin.

A 100-mile Super-Modified race was also held in 1968 and many racers from the Oswego Speedway competed. Steve Krisiloff, aged 21 (later to become an Indy Car driver) won the race to the surprise of many.

Race results
All winning drivers were American.

AAA/USAC/CART Championship Car

NASCAR Grand National/Winston Cup

Lap Records
The official race lap records at Trenton Speedway are listed as:

References

External links
 Circuit map

Buildings and structures in Mercer County, New Jersey
Champ Car circuits
NASCAR tracks
Motorsport venues in New Jersey
Defunct motorsport venues in the United States
NASCAR races at Trenton Speedway